Kravaře is a municipality and village in Česká Lípa District in the Liberec Region of the Czech Republic. It has about 800 inhabitants. There are three well preserved areas, protected by law as two village monument reservations (the  villages of Janovice and Rané) and one village monument zone (the village of Kravaře).

Administrative parts
Villages of Janovice, Rané, Sezímky, Veliká and Víska are administrative parts of Kravaře.

References

Villages in Česká Lípa District